Adrian Dudley Saunders (born 4 January 1954) is a judge from Saint Vincent and the Grenadines. Since 2005, he has been a judge of the Caribbean Court of Justice.

Early life 

Saunders was born in Saint Vincent. He earned his LLB degree with honours from the University of the West Indies at Cave Hill in 1975.

In 1996, Saunders was appointed a judge of the Eastern Caribbean Supreme Court (ECSC). He became a High Court Judge in 1997 and from 1997 to 2001 served as a judge in Montserrat and Anguilla. In 2001, he began serving as a judge in Saint Lucia.

In 2003, Saunders became a Justice of Appeal of the ECSC and in 2004 he became the acting Chief Justice of the ECSC, succeeding Dennis Byron. As Chief Justice, he was the supreme judicial officer of the courts of Anguilla, Antigua and Barbuda, the British Virgin Islands, Dominica, Grenada, Montserrat, Saint Kitts and Nevis, Saint Lucia, and Saint Vincent and the Grenadines. In 2005, he was appointed as a judge of the Caribbean Court of Justice and stepped down from the ECSC.

In 2009, Mr. Justice Saunders became the Chairman of the Caribbean Association of Judicial Officers, a position which he continues to hold.  In April 2018, he was appointed to the Advisory Board of the Global Judicial Integrity Network by the United Nations Office on Drugs and Crime’s (UNODC) Global Programme for the Implementation of the Doha Declaration.

In July 2018,  he was sworn in as the third President of the Caribbean Court of Justice by His Excellency, the Most Honourable Sir Patrick Allen, ON, GCMG, CD, KSt.J, Governor General of Jamaica at the Montego Bay Convention Centre, Montego Bay, Jamaica.

References
"The Honourable Mr. Justice Adrian Saunders", caribbeancourtofjustice.org.

1954 births
Caribbean Court of Justice judges
Chief justices of the Eastern Caribbean Supreme Court
Saint Vincent and the Grenadines judges on the courts of Anguilla
Saint Vincent and the Grenadines judges on the courts of Montserrat
Saint Vincent and the Grenadines judges on the courts of Saint Lucia
Saint Vincent and the Grenadines judges
Saint Vincent and the Grenadines lawyers
People from Saint Vincent (Antilles)
Living people
University of the West Indies alumni
Saint Vincent and the Grenadines judges of international courts and tribunals